Sharda Bhargava (1912–1999) was a leader of Indian National Congress and a member of Rajya Sabha from Rajasthan. She was member of Rajya Sabha from 1952 to 1966 and also served as its vice chairperson during 1956–57 period. She was daughter of Mukat Behari Lal Bhargava.

References

1912 births
1999 deaths
Politicians from Jaipur
Rajya Sabha members from Rajasthan
Women in Rajasthan politics
20th-century Indian women politicians
20th-century Indian politicians
Indian National Congress politicians from Rajasthan
Women members of the Rajya Sabha